Sorède (that is cork oak wood) is a commune in the Pyrénées-Orientales department in southern France.

Geography 
Sorède is located in the canton of Vallespir-Albères and in the arrondissement of Céret.

Government and politics

Mayors

Population

Sites of interest 
 The main church "St Assiscle et Ste Victoire", 14th century choir, 17th century Baroque sculptures.
 Notre-Dame du Château, an 18th-century sanctuary dedicated to the Virgin Mary in the mountains, and the ruins of the castle of Ultrera, dating from the early Middle Ages.
 Saint Martin de Lavail, a 9th-century Romanesque chapel.
 Since the 13th century, whips have been made from  the local celtis tree. Celtis whips are still made by hand today in Sorède and visitors can tour the workshop where they are made.

Notable people 
 Father Antonio Gomes, known as « Padre Himalaya », a Portuguese scientist and priest who experimented with one of the first solar ovens in Sorède in 1900.
 Philippe David Clarke - was one of the early winners of the Euro Millions Lottery in February 2004. Clarke won an estimated 19,000,000 Euros. He has lived between Sorède and Kent, UK for most of his life.

See also
Puig Neulós
Communes of the Pyrénées-Orientales department

References

Communes of Pyrénées-Orientales